Smith Creek is a stream in the U.S. state of South Dakota. It is a tributary of Crow Creek.

Smith Creek has the name of Harry C. Smith, a law enforcement agent.

See also
List of rivers of South Dakota

References

Rivers of Brule County, South Dakota
Rivers of Buffalo County, South Dakota
Rivers of Jerauld County, South Dakota
Rivers of South Dakota